The Fargo-Moorhead Bears were a Tier 1 junior ice hockey team playing in the United States Hockey League (USHL).  The Bears began playing in the 1995–96, following the folding of the Wisconsin Capitols franchise, leaving the USHL with 11 teams for the season. Fargo-Moorhead finished their only season in operation in third place of the 11-team single division with a record of 27-17-1-1.

Ceased Operations
The Fargo-Moorhead Bears ceased operation after the 1995-96 USHL season concluded. Their home venue, however, was not without a main tenant long as the expansion Fargo-Moorhead Ice Sharks were granted an expansion team in the USHL beginning in the 1996–97 season.

References

External links 
Fargo-Moorhead Bears Team History at hockeyDB.com

Ice hockey teams in Minnesota
United States Hockey League teams
1995 establishments in Minnesota
1996 disestablishments in Minnesota
Ice hockey clubs established in 1995
Sports clubs disestablished in 1996
Moorhead, Minnesota